Blevins is a surname of Welsh origin. Notable people with the surname include:
Al Blevins, American football and basketball coach
Bret Blevins, American comic book artist
Christopher Blevins, American Cyclist
Dean Blevins, American football player, and broadcaster
Frank Blevins (1939–2013), Australian politician
Gayle Blevins, American softball coach
Harold Blevins, American basketball player and coach
Harry Blevins (1935–2018), American politician
Jerry Blevins, American MLB pitcher
Juliette Blevins, American linguist
Tyler Blevins, better known as Ninja (born 1991), American eSports player

Welsh-language surnames